Veil of Remembrance is the second full-length album by the Swedish group Crimson Moonlight. Veil of Remembrance was officially released on January 26, 2005 although it was already available since December 4, 2004.

Overview
On Veil of Remembrance, Crimson Moonlight began playing a hybrid mixture of black and death metal with grindcore influences. Simon Rosén has said about the stylistic direction:

Veil of Remembrance received a positive reception, as Rosén says:

Track listing
"Intimations of Everlasting Constancy" - 04:42 
"Painful Mind Contradiction" - 04:31 
"Embraced by the Beauty of Cold" - 03:15 
"The Echoes of Thought" - 03:55
"My Grief, My Remembrance" - 05:31 
"The Cold Grip of Terror" - 05:41 
"Illusion Was True Beauty" - 04:45 
"Contemplations Along the Way" - 05:53 
"Reflections Upon the Distress and Agony of Faith" - 05:00

Curiosity
The Lyrics of the tracks 8 and 9 ("Contemplations Along the Way" - "Reflections Upon the Distress and Agony of Faith") are a text parts of the Søren Kierkegaard's book "Fear and Trembling".

References

Crimson Moonlight albums
2005 albums